The 2019 FIFA Women's World Cup qualification process decided all 24 teams which played in the 2019 FIFA Women's World Cup, with the hosts France qualifying automatically. It is the eighth FIFA Women's World Cup, the quadrennial international women's football world championship tournament. The tournament is the third to be hosted in Europe, after the 1995 FIFA Women's World Cup in Sweden and the 2011 FIFA Women's World Cup in Germany.

Qualified teams

Qualification process
The slot allocation was approved by the FIFA Council on 13–14 October 2016. The slots for each confederation are unchanged from that of the previous tournament except the slot for the hosts is moved from CONCACAF (Canada) to UEFA (France).

Summary of qualification
Qualifying matches started on 3 April 2017, and ended on 1 December 2018.

Apart from the host France, 207 of the 210 remaining FIFA member associations could qualify through their own confederation's qualifying process if they choose to enter. The exceptions were Guatemala and Kuwait, whose football associations were suspended by FIFA, and Equatorial Guinea, which were banned from the 2019 FIFA Women's World Cup. Guam, Lebanon, Sierra Leone, and Turks and Caicos Islands were initially drawn into qualifying stages but they withdrew from their qualifying  tournaments.

More than 30 countries, mostly in Asia and Africa, did not enter qualification, including Saudi Arabia, Tunisia and Egypt, which qualified teams for the 2018 FIFA World Cup.

 H: Hosts

Confederation qualification

AFC

As in the previous World Cup cycle, the AFC Women's Asian Cup served as the World Cup qualifying tournament for AFC members. The World Cup qualifying process was as follows:
Qualifying stage: The qualifying for the 2018 AFC Women's Asian Cup was held from 3 to 12 April 2017. 24 teams entered the competition, with Japan, Australia, and China automatically qualified for the final tournament by their position as the top three teams of the 2014 AFC Women's Asian Cup and thus not participating in the qualifying competition. Jordan also automatically qualified for the final tournament as hosts, but decided to also participate in the qualifying competition. The 21 teams were drawn into one group of six teams and three groups of five teams. In each group, teams played each other once at a centralised venue, and the four group winners qualified for the final tournament. Since Jordan won their group, the runner-up of this group also qualified for the final tournament.
Final tournament: Eight teams played in the 2018 AFC Women's Asian Cup, which was held from 6 to 20 April 2018 in Jordan. They were drawn into two groups of four teams. The top two teams of each group qualified for the 2019 FIFA Women's World Cup as well as advance to the knockout stage, while the third-placed teams of each group advanced to the fifth-placed play-off, where the winner of the play-off qualified for the World Cup.

Group stage

Fifth place play-off

CAF

As in the previous World Cup cycle, the Africa Women Cup of Nations served as the World Cup qualifying tournament for CAF members. The World Cup qualifying process was as follows:
Qualifying stage: The qualifying for the 2018 Africa Women Cup of Nations was held from 4 April to 9 June 2018. 24 teams entered the qualifying competition, with four teams (Nigeria, Cameroon, Equatorial Guinea, South Africa) earning byes to the second round, and the remaining 20 teams entering the first round. Qualification ties were played on a home-and-away two-legged basis. The seven winners of the second round qualified for the final tournament to join the hosts Ghana who qualified automatically.
Final tournament: Eight teams played in the 2018 Africa Women Cup of Nations, which was held from 17 November to 1 December 2018 in Ghana. They were drawn into two groups of four teams. The top two teams of each group advanced to the knockout stage, where the winners of the semi-finals and the third place play-off qualified for the World Cup.

FIFA banned Equatorial Guinea from qualifying for the 2019 FIFA Women's World Cup, meaning they could not qualify for the World Cup regardless of their performance in the Africa Women Cup of Nations.

Knockout stage

CONCACAF

As in the previous World Cup cycle, the CONCACAF Women's Championship served as the World Cup qualifying tournament for CONCACAF members. The World Cup qualifying process was as follows:
Qualifying stage: Regional qualification tournaments were held in the Central American Zone and the Caribbean Zone. Two teams from the Central American Zone and three teams from the Caribbean Zone qualified for the final tournament to join the three teams from the North American Zone, Canada, Mexico, and the United States, who qualified automatically.
Final tournament: Eight teams played in the 2018 CONCACAF Women's Championship, which was held from 4 to 17 October 2018 in the United States. They were drawn into two groups of four teams. The top two teams of each group advanced to the knockout stage, where the winners of the semi-finals and the third place play-off qualified for the World Cup. The losers of the third-place play-off entered the CONCACAF–CONMEBOL play-off.

Guadeloupe and Martinique entered Caribbean qualifying for the 2018 CONCACAF Women's Championship. However, as they are not FIFA members, they were ineligible to qualify for the World Cup.

Knockout stage

CONMEBOL

As in the previous World Cup cycle, the Copa América Femenina served as the World Cup qualifying tournament for CONMEBOL members. The World Cup qualifying process was as follows:
Final tournament: Ten teams played in the 2018 Copa América Femenina, which was held between 4 and 22 April 2018 in Chile. They were drawn into two groups of five teams. The top two teams of each group advanced to the round-robin final stage, where the top two teams qualified for the World Cup. The third-placed team entered the CONCACAF–CONMEBOL play-off.

Final stage

OFC

As in the previous World Cup cycle, the OFC Women's Nations Cup served as the World Cup qualifying tournament for OFC members. The World Cup qualifying process was as follows:
Qualifying stage: The four lowest-ranked teams based on previous regional performances of all women's national teams (American Samoa, Solomon Islands, Vanuatu and Fiji) entered the qualifying stage, which was held from 24 to 30 August 2018 in Fiji. The winner qualified for the final tournament, joining the other seven teams which automatically qualified.
Final tournament: Eight teams played in the final tournament, which was held between 18 November to 1 December 2018 in New Caledonia. They were drawn into two groups of four teams. The top two teams of each group advanced to the knockout stage (semi-finals and final) to decide the winner of the OFC Women's Nations Cup which qualified for the World Cup.

Knockout stage

UEFA

As in the previous World Cup cycle, UEFA organised a tournament for its members designed only for World Cup qualifying. The World Cup qualifying process was as follows:
Preliminary round: The 16 lowest-ranked teams of the 46 entrants according to their UEFA coefficient entered the preliminary round, which was held from 3 to 11 April 2017. They were drawn into four groups of four teams, where each group played in single round-robin format at one of the pre-selected hosts. The four group winners and the best runner-up (not counting results against the fourth-placed team) advanced to the qualifying group stage. 
Qualifying group stage: 35 teams, including the 30 highest-ranked teams which received byes and the five qualifiers from the preliminary round, played in the qualifying group stage, which was held on dates in the FIFA Women's International Match Calendar from 11 September 2017 to 4 September 2018. They were drawn into seven groups of five teams, where each group was played in home-and-away round-robin format. The seven group winners qualified for the 2019 FIFA Women's World Cup, while the four best runners-up (not counting results against the fifth-placed team) advanced to the play-offs.
Play-offs: The four teams played two knockout rounds of home-and-away two-legged matches, which were held from 1 to 9 October and 5 to 13 November 2018, where the winner of the play-off final round qualified for the World Cup.

Qualifying group stage

Ranking of second-placed teams (only results against first, third and fourth-placed teams taken into account)

Play-offs

CONMEBOL–CONCACAF play-off

The inter-confederation play-off was contested between CONCACAF's fourth-placed team Panama and CONMEBOL's third-placed team Argentina. The winners qualified for the World Cup.

Top goalscorers

References

External links
FIFA website

 
Qualification
2019
2017 in women's association football
2018 in women's association football